This is a list of Chief Executive Members of the Bodoland Territorial Council, the leader of the Bodoland Territorial Council, the autonomous district council for the Bodoland Territorial Region in India.

The chief executive chairs meetings of the Executive Committee of the Bodoland Territorial Council.

The Bodoland Territorial Council was established in 2003 and Hagrama Mohilary was the first person to hold the position of Chief Executive Member, doing so until 27 April 2020.

The council was under Governor's rule between 27 April 2020 and 15 December 2020 following the postponement of elections scheduled for 4 April 2020 a result of the global coronavirus pandemic.

List of chief executives

Deputy Chief Executive Member

The Chief Executive Member leads an executive committee made up of several Executive Members one of whom may be designated as Deputy Chief Executive Member.

List of deputy chief executives

See also
 Bodoland
 Bodoland Territorial Council

References

Bodoland
Indian government officials